Disney's Pinocchio is a platform puzzle adventure game from Virgin Interactive. It was released in 1996 for the Game Boy, Super NES, and Sega Genesis and is based on Walt Disney's animated feature film Pinocchio, originally released in 1940. The game was published by Capcom in Japan for the Super Famicom on the same year. A Sega 32X version of the game was made and completed, but was not released due to the add-on's limited popularity.

Storyline

The game uses intertitles between levels to convey the story, in the form of a children's storybook. Pinocchio travels from home and must choose to go to School or Easy Street (though the choice does not affect the level order). He then travels from Stromboli's marionette show to Pleasure Island and then into the sea, where he saves Geppetto from inside Monstro and they escape.

Reception

Coach Kyle of GamePro gave the Genesis version a negative review, commenting that both the gameplay design and controls are shallow and rudimentary, the character animations are stiff, and the graphics lack detail. He concluded: "What a shame that such a long-awaited game, with such a famous story as a foundation, should turn out to be so disappointing". The Feature Creature, however, gave the Game Boy version a mixed review, saying it simply translates the simplistic and easy levels from the Genesis version into portable form.

Notes

References

External links

1996 video games
Black Pearl Software games
Cancelled Sega 32X games
Disney video games
Game Boy games
Nintendo games
Pinocchio (1940 film)
Sega games
Sega Genesis games
Single-player video games
Super Nintendo Entertainment System games
THQ games
Video games about children
Video games about toys
Video games based on adaptations
Video games based on films
Video games developed in the United Kingdom
Video games scored by Allister Brimble
Video games set in Italy
Video games set in the 19th century
Video games set on fictional islands
Virgin Interactive games
NMS Software games